Shia Saide LaBeouf (born June 11, 1986) is an American actor, performance artist, and filmmaker. He played Louis Stevens in the Disney Channel series Even Stevens, a role for which he received Young Artist Award nominations in 2001 and 2002 and won a Daytime Emmy Award in 2003. He made his film debut in The Christmas Path (1998). In 2004, he made his directorial debut with the short film Let's Love Hate and later directed a short film titled Maniac (2011), starring American rappers Cage and Kid Cudi.

In 2007, LaBeouf starred in the commercially successful films Disturbia and Surf's Up. The same year he was cast in Michael Bay's science fiction film Transformers as Sam Witwicky, the main protagonist of the series. Transformers was a box office success and one of the highest-grossing films of 2007. LaBeouf later appeared in its sequels Transformers: Revenge of the Fallen (2009) and Transformers: Dark of the Moon (2011), both also box office successes. In 2008, he played Henry "Mutt Williams" Jones III in Indiana Jones and the Kingdom of the Crystal Skull.

His other credits include the films Holes (2003), Constantine (2005), Wall Street: Money Never Sleeps (2010), Lawless (2012), The Company You Keep (2012), Nymphomaniac (2013), Charlie Countryman (2013), Fury (2014), American Honey (2016), Borg vs McEnroe (2017), Honey Boy (2019), The Peanut Butter Falcon (2019), Pieces of a Woman (2020), and Padre Pio (2022).

Since 2014, LaBeouf has pursued a variety of public performance art projects with LaBeouf, Rönkkö & Turner.

Early life
LaBeouf was born on June 11, 1986, in Los Angeles, California. He is the only child of Shayna Saide and Jeffrey LaBeouf. His mother was a visual artist, jewelry designer, and former dancer, while his father is a Vietnam War veteran and former professional clown. His mother died of heart failure in August 2022. LaBeouf's mother was Jewish, and his father, who is of Cajun French descent, is Christian. He has stated that he was raised around "both sides"; he had a Bar Mitzvah ceremony, and was also baptized. One of the camps he attended was Christian. In Hebrew, his first name Shia translates as 'gift of God'. He embraced the Catholic faith in 2022.

LaBeouf has described his parents as "hippies", his father as "tough as nails and a different breed of man", and his upbringing as similar to a "hippy lifestyle", stating that his parents were "pretty weird people, but they loved me and I loved them." His parents eventually divorced, mainly owing to financial problems, and LaBeouf had what he has described as a "good childhood", growing up poor in Echo Park with his mother, who worked selling fabrics and brooches. LaBeouf's uncle was going to adopt him at one stage because his parents could not afford to have him anymore and "they had too much pride to go on welfare or food stamps." As a way of dealing with his parents' divorce, he would perform for his family, mimicking his father. 

LaBeouf has stated that during his childhood, his father was "on drugs" and was placed in drug rehabilitation for heroin addiction, while LaBeouf's mother was "trying to hold down the fort." During a period when his father was in rehab for his addictions, when Labeouf was around the age of 10, he overheard his mother being raped by a stranger in their home. 

Labeouf then lived with his father from the age of 12 whilst he was filming Even Stevens, with his father serving as his on-set guardian. During this time, he accompanied his father to meetings of Alcoholics Anonymous. LaBeouf has also said he was subjected to abuse by his father, who once pointed a gun at his son during a Vietnam War flashback. LaBeouf remains close to and financially supports both of his parents.

He attended 32nd Street Visual and Performing Arts Magnet in Los Angeles (LAUSD) and Alexander Hamilton High School, although he received most of his education from tutors. In an interview, LaBeouf said that, looking back on his childhood, he feels grateful and considers some of those memories as scars.

LaBeouf completed the 2010 Los Angeles Marathon on March 21, 2010, with a time of 4 hours, 35 minutes and 31 seconds.

Career

1996–2006: Career beginnings and Even Stevens
Prior to acting, LaBeouf practiced comedy around his neighborhood as an "escape" from a hostile environment. At age 10, he began performing stand-up at The Improv, describing his appeal as having "disgustingly dirty" material and a "50-year-old mouth on the 10-year-old kid." He subsequently found an agent through the Yellow Pages and was taken on after pretending to be his own manager. LaBeouf has said that he initially became an actor because his family was broke, not because he wanted to pursue an acting career, having originally gotten the idea from a child actor he met who had things he wanted.

In the early 2000s, LaBeouf became known among young audiences after playing Louis Stevens on the Disney Channel weekly program Even Stevens, a role that later earned him a Daytime Emmy Award. He has said that "[he] grew up on that show" and being cast was the "best thing" that happened to him. In the next several years, he appeared in the film Holes (2003), which received praise. In 2005, he co-starred in Constantine, playing the role of Chas Kramer, with Keanu Reeves in the starring role. The same year he provided the voice of Asbel in the Disney-produced English dub of Nausicaä of the Valley of the Wind. LaBeouf made his directorial debut with the short film Let's Love Hate with Lorenzo Eduardo. He has played real-life people, including golfer Francis Ouimet and the younger version of Dito Montiel in A Guide to Recognizing Your Saints (2006).

2007–2011: Breakthrough and big-budget films

LaBeouf starred in Disturbia, a thriller released on April 13, 2007, as a teenager under house arrest who suspects that his neighbor is a serial killer, which he considered a "character-driven" role. He received positive reviews for the role, with The Buffalo News writing that he "is able to simultaneously pull off [the character's] anger, remorse and intelligence". He hosted Saturday Night Live on April 14, 2007, and returned the following season to host the episode that aired on May 10, 2008.

LaBeouf starred in the 2007 film Transformers as Sam Witwicky opposite Megan Fox. His character is a human who becomes involved in the conflict between Autobots and Decepticons. The film received mixed reviews from critics, with LaBeouf's performance receiving similarly average reviews. The film became LaBeouf's highest-grossing film at the time.

In Indiana Jones and the Kingdom of the Crystal Skull (2008), LaBeouf portrayed Indiana Jones' greaser son, Mutt Williams. Stephanie Zachaek of Salon deemed his performance "appealing enough" and wrote that he "sensibly keeps his performance as low-key as possible". LaBeouf told the Los Angeles Times that he felt he as an actor "dropped the ball" on Jones' legacy, and "there was a reason" the film was not universally accepted. His next film was Eagle Eye, released on September 26. Josh Bell of Las Vegas Weekly said he "makes a credible bid for action-hero status, although his occasional stabs at emotional depth don't really go anywhere."

In February, LaBeouf made his music video directorial debut, directing the video for "I Never Knew You", a single by American rapper Cage, from his third album Depart from Me (2009). It was shot in Los Angeles and features several cameo appearances from Cage's Definitive Jux label-mates. Through Cage, LaBeouf met Kid Cudi. All three of them later worked on a short film titled Maniac (2011), which was inspired by the song of the same name from Cudi's second album Man on the Moon II: The Legend of Mr. Rager (2010). Aside from directing the short film, LaBeouf directed the music video for Kid Cudi's song "Marijuana", which he filmed at the 2010 Cannabis Cup.

He appeared in the Oliver Stone-directed film Wall Street: Money Never Sleeps (2010), the sequel to Wall Street (1987). In this, LaBeouf played an ambitious Wall Street trader. The Hollywood Reporter named LaBeouf as one of the young male actors who are "pushing – or being pushed" into taking over Hollywood as the new "A-List".

LaBeouf reprised the role of Sam Witwicky in the 2009 sequel to Transformers, Transformers: Revenge of the Fallen. Filming began in May 2008 and ended in late 2008. Due to LaBeouf's injury from his car accident, director Michael Bay and screenwriter Roberto Orci had to rewrite the script to protect his hand throughout filming. LaBeouf said production was only delayed two days after his accident because Bay made up for it by filming second unit scenes, and LaBeouf recovered a few weeks earlier than expected, allowing him to return to the set. Near the end of filming, LaBeouf injured his eye when he hit a prop; the injury required several stitches. He resumed filming two hours later. While the movie grossed $800 million, it received mostly negative reviews by critics, with LaBeouf sharing a nomination for the "Worst Screen Couple of 2009" Razzie Award with "either Megan Fox or any Transformer." He reprised his role in the third live-action Transformers film, Transformers: Dark of the Moon, which was released on June 28, 2011. He did not return for the fourth film in the series, Transformers: Age of Extinction, and Mark Wahlberg was cast as a new lead character.

2012–present: Subsequent career
In June 2012, Icelandic band Sigur Rós released a music video for the song "Fjögur Píanó". It depicts "a man and woman locked in a never-ending cycle of addiction and desire", in which LaBeouf stars and appears nude. In 2012, Rob Cantor of Tally Hall produced a song describing LaBeouf as a murderous cannibal. In 2014, Cantor produced a music video based on this song. Despite the title and lyrics, the intent was humorous and non-serious, and LaBeouf appeared at the end of the video, applauding.

LaBeouf has created three short graphic novels Stale N Mate, Cyclical, and Let's Fucking Party, and a webcomic series, Cheek Up's through the publishing company, The Campaign Book. In April 2012, he promoted them at Chicago Comic & Entertainment Expo. In the same year, LaBeouf played a bootlegger in John Hillcoat's crime drama Lawless.

In February 2013, he pulled out of what would have been his Broadway debut, in Lyle Kessler's play Orphans, citing "creative differences" with co-star Alec Baldwin, although The New York Times and Baldwin himself maintain LaBeouf was fired. A month later, a film in which he starred alongside Robert Redford titled The Company You Keep was released. He next portrayed Jerôme Morris in the Lars von Trier-directed erotic art film Nymphomaniac, which premiered in December 2013. Meanwhile, at the film's screening at the Berlin Film Festival a tuxedoed LaBeouf walked the red carpet with a paper bag over his head with the words "I am not famous anymore" written upon it.

LaBeouf co-starred with Brad Pitt and Logan Lerman in David Ayer's World War II-set film, Fury, which was released in October 2014. Peter Travers of Rolling Stone called LaBeouf's performance "outstanding", whilst New York Daily Newss Joe Neumaier commented that he "finally finds a role he can disappear into, without his image getting in the way." Calvin Wilson of St. Louis Post-Dispatch called LaBeouf's performance one of his best.

In 2015, LaBeouf starred in Sia's music video for "Elastic Heart" along with Maddie Ziegler. He also starred in the war-thriller film Man Down directed by Dito Montiel alongside Gary Oldman and Kate Mara. In 2016, LaBeouf starred in American Honey, directed by Andrea Arnold, playing the male lead role, Jake. In Variety, Guy Lodge wrote that "despite the apparent stunt casting of LaBeouf", he "easily delivers his best performance here, bleeding the eccentricities of his own celebrity persona into the character to fascinating, oddly moving effect". In 2017, he portrayed tennis player John McEnroe in the Swedish sports drama film Borg vs McEnroe.

In 2019, LaBeouf starred in the comedy-drama film The Peanut Butter Falcon, which premiered in March, and was released in August. In the same year, he portrayed a character based on his father in the film Honey Boy, which he also wrote. He penned the screenplay while in rehab and based it upon his life as an actor. Both The Peanut Butter Falcon and Honey Boy garnered acclaim from critics. The following year, LaBeouf starred in The Tax Collector, directed by David Ayer. In September 2020, he participated in a virtual reading of the comedy-drama film Fast Times at Ridgemont High. LaBeouf starred in the Netflix drama film Pieces of a Woman opposite Vanessa Kirby, directed by Kornél Mundruczó.

Performance art

In early 2014, LaBeouf began collaborating with British artist and author of The Metamodernist Manifesto, Luke Turner, and Finnish artist Nastja Säde Rönkkö, embarking on a series of actions described by Dazed as "a multi-platform meditation on celebrity and vulnerability". Since then, LaBeouf, Rönkkö & Turner have engaged in numerous high-profile performance art projects, including #IAMSORRY (2014), #Allmymovies (2015), #Touchmysoul (2015), #Takemeanywhere (2016), and Hewillnotdivide.us (2017–2021).

On February 9, 2014, the artists caused controversy at the Berlin Film Festival when LaBeouf arrived at the red carpet wearing a brown paper bag over his head with the words "I am not famous anymore" written on it. In a conversation conducted as part of the trio's #Interview piece in November 2014, LaBeouf said that he was "heartbroken" and "genuinely remorseful and full of shame and guilt" at the start of their subsequent #Iamsorry performance, in which he occupied a Los Angeles gallery for six days wearing the paper bag and silently crying in front of visitors, but that "in the end I felt cared for however it came—it was beautiful, it blew me away." He revealed, however, that one woman had proceeded to sexually assault him during the February performance, while Rönkkö and Turner later clarified that they had prevented the assault by intervening as soon as they were aware of the incident starting to occur.

In 2015, LaBeouf appeared in #Introductions, a half-hour video made by LaBeouf, Rönkkö & Turner in collaboration with Central Saint Martins Fine Art students, comprising a series of short monologues performed by LaBeouf in front of a green screen. One segment in the form of an exaggerated motivational speech, dubbed "Just Do It" after the Nike slogan, became an Internet meme after going viral within days of being released, spawning numerous remixes and parodies, and becoming the most searched for GIF of 2015 according to Google.

Personal life

Relationships 
LaBeouf met British actress Mia Goth while filming Nymphomaniac in 2012. On October 10, 2016, LaBeouf and Goth appeared to have married in a Las Vegas ceremony officiated by an Elvis impersonator. Two days later, a local official said that the pair were not legally married, but instead a commitment ceremony was performed. Later that month, LaBeouf confirmed their nuptials on The Ellen DeGeneres Show. In September 2018, it was announced the couple had separated and filed for divorce. In February 2022, it was reported that Goth and LaBeouf had reconciled and she was pregnant with their first child. Their daughter was born in March 2022.

LaBeouf dated British musician FKA Twigs from 2018 to 2019. He began dating American actress Margaret Qualley in 2020 after they co-starred in her sister Rainey Qualley's short film music video "Love Me Like You Hate Me". The relationship reportedly ended in January 2021, and in September, Qualley told Harper's Bazaar that she believed FKA Twigs's abuse allegations against LaBeouf.

Politics
In 2015, LaBeouf endorsed Jeremy Corbyn's campaign in the Labour Party leadership election in the United Kingdom. He told the Evening Standard: "I like Jeremy Corbyn. I like him in every way. British politics just got very exciting."

Religion
LaBeouf contributed an essay to the 2004 book I Am Jewish by Judea Pearl, in which he stated that he has a "personal relationship with God that happens to work within the confines of Judaism". LaBeouf had described himself as Jewish, but declared in 2007 that religion had "never made sense" to him. However, LaBeouf said in an interview in Interview magazine in October 2014 that "I found God doing [the film] Fury. I became a Christian man [...] Brad [Pitt] was really instrumental in guiding my head through this."

In an August 2022 interview with Bishop Robert Barron, LaBeouf said that he had fallen in love with the Catholic faith while studying for the titular role of the film Padre Pio and staying in a Capuchin monastery in the process. He stated that the Traditional Latin Mass played a key role in his conversion. Widely reported as a conversion, the National Catholic Register investigated and found that, he had not completed a formal path to reception into the Catholic Church.

Controversies

Plagiarism accusations
On December 17, 2013, LaBeouf released his short film Howard Cantour.com to the Internet; shortly thereafter, several bloggers noted its close similarity to Justin M. Damiano, a 2007 comic by Ghost World creator Dan Clowes. Wired journalist Graeme McMillan noted at least three similarities in his article, one of which was that the opening monologue for the short and the comic were identical. LaBeouf would later remove the film and claim that he did not intend to copy Clowes but was instead "inspired" by him and "got lost in the creative process." He followed this up with several apologies via Twitter writing, "In my excitement and naiveté as an amateur filmmaker, I got lost in the creative process and neglected to follow proper accreditation", and "I deeply regret the manner in which these events have unfolded and want @danielclowes to know that I have a great respect for his work". Clowes responded by saying "The first I ever heard of the film was this morning when someone sent me a link. I've never spoken to or met Mr. LaBeouf ... I actually can't imagine what was going through his mind." LaBeouf was criticized over his apology, with some sites such as The A.V. Club noting that the apology itself appeared to have been lifted from a 2010 post on Yahoo! Answers.

Since the initial discovery of the plagiarism of Clowe's work, LaBeouf's other work has come under scrutiny. News outlets reported that LaBeouf's graphic novels, Let's Fucking Party and Stale N Mate, had been plagiarized from Benoît Duteurtre's The Little Girl and the Cigarette and Charles Bukowski's Assault.

In January 2014, LaBeouf spoke about the plagiarism accusations with Bleeding Cool writer Rich Johnston, stating that he saw copyright laws as too restrictive and that they did not allow for ideas to flow freely. LaBeouf later tweeted a description of his next project, Daniel Boring (a reference to David Boring, another comic created by Clowes). The description of the project was also taken word-for-word from a description by Clowes of his comic. Clowes' attorney, Michael Kump, has since sent a cease-and-desist letter to LaBeouf's attorney, which LaBeouf posted on Twitter.

Legal issues
On June 26, 2014, LaBeouf was arrested at New York City's Studio 54 theater and subsequently charged with disorderly conduct, harassment, and criminal trespass. He was said to have been "acting disorderly, yelling and being loud". Following the incident, LaBeouf voluntarily sought outpatient treatment for alcoholism. He pleaded guilty to disorderly conduct, while the trespassing and harassment charges were dropped.

On July 8, 2017, LaBeouf was arrested in downtown Savannah, Georgia, at around 4 a.m. for public intoxication, disorderly conduct, and obstruction. Bodycam footage showed LaBeouf making "profanity-laced racial remarks" towards police officers during his arrest. He later attributed the incident to his alcohol addiction. After pleading no contest to the charge of disorderly conduct in October 2017, LaBeouf was found guilty of obstruction but was found not guilty of public intoxication. He was sentenced to probation for one year, including time served, and ordered to pay a $1,000 fine as well as seek therapy to manage his anger and substance use issues.

In September 2020, LaBeouf was criminally charged with misdemeanor battery and petty theft for his involvement in an altercation with a man in June of that year. He pleaded not guilty. A judge ordered LaBeouf into a diversion program in May 2021, with the charges possibly dropped should LaBeouf complete the program within a year.

Abuse allegations 
In December 2020, LaBeouf was sued by his ex-girlfriend Tahliah Debrett Barnett (known professionally as FKA Twigs) for sexual battery, assault, and infliction of emotional distress. The lawsuit also detailed allegations that he abused another ex-girlfriend, stylist Karolyn Pho. LaBeouf stated in his response that he had been "abusive" to himself and those around him "for years" and that he was "ashamed" and "sorry to those [he] hurt"; he later denied the allegations. 

Following the lawsuit, Netflix removed him from its awards campaign for Pieces of a Woman. He subsequently took a hiatus from acting and began receiving treatment. During an interview with Jon Bernthal on his Real Ones podcast in August 2022, LaBeouf remarked that he had "hurt that woman", adding, "I was a pleasure-seeking, selfish, self-centered, dishonest, inconsiderate, fearful human being." 

His trial for abuse against FKA Twigs is set for April 17, 2023.

Casting 
 
In April 2020, LaBeouf was attached to star in the psychological thriller film Don't Worry Darling, directed by Olivia Wilde. He was replaced by Harry Styles in September 2020 due to "scheduling conflicts". Wilde later stated that she fired LaBeouf due to his "combative energy", clashing with cast and crew before filming started, including Florence Pugh who expressed being uncomfortable with LaBeouf's behavior.

LaBeouf denied he was fired and that he "quit the film due to lack of rehearsal time" in August 2020. In August 2022, Variety published a story containing email forwards sent to Wilde disputing her firing claims along with photos of text messages and videos from Wilde in August 2020 asking LaBeouf to reconsider quitting the film. Representatives for Wilde and the studio declined to comment on LaBeouf's allegations, although Wilde later stated to Vanity Fair that "all I'll say is he was replaced". Vanity Fair reported that LaBeouf gave Wilde an ultimatum to choose between him and Pugh, with Wilde choosing Pugh.

Filmography

Film

Television

Table read

Music video

Video game

Web

Awards and nominations

References

External links

 
 

1986 births
Living people
20th-century American male actors
21st-century American male actors
Alexander Hamilton High School (Los Angeles) alumni
American Roman Catholics
American male child actors
American male film actors
American male television actors
American male voice actors
American music video directors
American people of French descent
American people of Jewish descent
American performance artists
American filmmakers
Converts to Roman Catholicism from atheism or agnosticism
BAFTA Rising Star Award winners
Emmy Award winners
Daytime Emmy Award winners
Male actors from Los Angeles
Metamodernism
Method actors
People from Echo Park, Los Angeles
People involved in plagiarism controversies
People with post-traumatic stress disorder
Converts to Christianity from atheism or agnosticism